E24 (or commonly E24 Bollywood) is an Indian cable television and satellite network, owned by BAG Films & Media Limited.  It was started in March 2008.

Programming
waz de kahan Hai
Its Controversial
Dil se Dil tak
Golden Era
U me aur TV
Bheja Fry
Bollywood Dhamaal
Bollywood Reporter
Bollywood Tambola
Bollywood 20 20
Bollywood ka super Train
Chatty with Katty
Confessions
Dance 10
E-Special
E24 Review Show
Fresh Maal
Gold Safe
Hit List
Hitz Start
Love Byte
Star Shake
E24 Cinema

Hindi-language television channels in India
Television channels and stations established in 2008
Television stations in New Delhi